The LCDR A class was a class of 0-4-4T steam locomotives of the London, Chatham and Dover Railway. The class was designed by William Kirtley and introduced in 1875. The A1 and A2 classes were similar, but had larger driving wheels. The differences between the A1 and A2 classes were minor: in particular, the A2 class had a larger heating surface.

Numbering

Ownership changes
All the A, A1 and A2 class locomotives passed to the South Eastern and Chatham Railway in 1899. Number 570 was withdrawn in 1915 but the remaining locomotives passed to the Southern Railway in 1923. All had been withdrawn by 1926.

References

 

A
0-4-4T locomotives
Railway locomotives introduced in 1884
Scrapped locomotives
Standard gauge steam locomotives of Great Britain